Ermal Tahiri (born 27 April 1969) is an Albanian retired footballer who played as a midfielder for a number of clubs in Albania and Greece.

Club career
Tahiri began his career in Albania, playing several seasons with Dinamo Tirana and winning the 1989–90 Albanian championship.

Tahiri moved to Greece to play in the Greek second division with PAS Giannina F.C. on a six-month contract in December 1995. He would move to  Ialysos F.C. and Panegialios F.C. before returning to PAS Giannina for six months in December 1997.

International career
He made his debut for Albania in a September 1990 friendly match against Greece and earned a total of 4 caps, scoring no goals. His final international was another friendly against Greece, in September 1991.

Personal life
Today he runs a business in the Greek city of Ioannina and he is coach of the junior team of PAS Giannina. In 2014, he was director of the Loro Boriçi National Football School.

Honours
Albanian Superliga: 1
 1990

References

External links

1969 births
Living people
Footballers from Tirana
Albanian footballers
Association football midfielders
Albania international footballers
FK Dinamo Tirana players
PAS Giannina F.C. players
Panegialios F.C. players
Kategoria Superiore players
Albanian expatriate footballers
Expatriate footballers in Greece
Albanian expatriate sportspeople in Greece
Albanian emigrants to Greece